Bough Beech is a hamlet in the county of Kent, England, and is south of the Bough Beech Reservoir. It is located approximately three miles east of Edenbridge (of which it is part) and five miles south west of Sevenoaks. It is in the civil parish of Chiddingstone.  The reservoir is a nature reserve, in particular for bird watching; it is especially important for migrating osprey, though they are a rare sight now the reservoir is no longer stocked with trout.

The reservoir is owned by the SES Water Company, who supply tap water to settlements west of the reservoir; including Gatwick Airport in West Sussex and Morden in south London.

The hamlet of Bough Beech is close to the Redhill to Tonbridge Line and has a pub, 'The Wheatsheaf'.

References

External links

Bough Beech Local Information

Villages in Kent